VCB may refer to:

 Nut Tree Airport (FCC id: VCB), Vacaville, Solano County, California, USA
 Real Aero Club de Vizcaya (ICAO airline code: VCB) of Spain, see List of airline codes (R)
 Veronica Campbell-Brown (born 1982) Jamaican sprinter
 Victoria Commercial Bank, Kenya
 Village Community Boathouse, Manhattan, NYC, NYS, USA; a non-profit promoting nautical activity
 VCB (electronics), the voltage across the collector and the base, in a transistor; see Active load
 California Victim Compensation Board
 Vuelve Candy B. (1988-1996) racehorse
 VCB (2007 song), song by Kendrick Scott off the album The Source (Kendrick Scott album)
 Virtual Circuit Board, a sandbox game developed by Reverie Foundry

See also

 VBC (disambiguation)
 BVC (disambiguation)
 BCV (disambiguation)
 CBV (disambiguation)
 CVB (disambiguation)